The Llanidloes transmitting station is a broadcasting and telecommunications facility consisting of a self-supporting 23 m lattice mast erected on land that is itself about 245 m above sea level about 1 km to the west of the town of Llanidloes in Powys, Wales. It was originally built by the BBC, entering service just before Christmas 1966 transmitting the now-defunct 405-line VHF television system. Transmissions of the original three FM radio services began in February 1967.

Currently, the transmitter provides DVB-T digital television to the area, along with FM radio. With only 2 W ERP, the television broadcasts only cover the town of Llanidloes to the east, the radio broadcasts reach somewhat further east along the Severn valley towards Llandinam.

Specifications and history
As built, the 405-line television and VHF FM radio services came (indirectly) from Wenvoe near Cardiff, and this site was therefore classed as a relay of Wenvoe.

UHF television was added to the site in the late 1970s, launching with just the three programme services that were active at the time. S4C was added in 1982 when it launched. This made Llanidloes a very indirect off-air relay of Blaenplwyf, receiving its signal from Llandinam which relayed Long Mountain. Curiously, Long Mountain was classed as a relay of Blaenplwyf despite being fed from an SHF link from Blaenplwyf via Llangurig Link. A site was normally considered a "relay" only if it picked up its signal off-air.

Across the UK, 405-line television was finally shut down in January 1985. However, Llanidloes was closed early - in the second quarter of 1983.

When digital television was introduced in 2009, the site formally became a relay of Long Mountain which had now become classed as a main transmitter in its own right.

Services listed by frequency

Analogue television

19 December 1966 - Late 1975
BBC 405-line television started up with the site acting as an off-air relay transmitter of Llandrindod Wells about 25 km to the south.

Late 1975 - 1 November 1982
When 625-line colour television was added, the site additionally became an indirect relay of Blaenplwyf about 50 km to the west. The direct line-of-sight to Blaenplwyf is heavily obstructed and so Llanidloes rebroadcast the off-air signal from Llandinam's relay transmitter about 10 km to the east.

1 November 1982 - Second Quarter 1983
Channel 4 was added to the set transmitted from the site when it launched in November 1982. Being in Wales, Llanidloes radiated the S4C variant.

Second Quarter 1983 - 4 November 2009
Llanidloes's Band III transmitter ended its service after 16 years. From then until the start of the digital switchover 26 years later, only UHF television would be available from the site.

Analogue and digital television

4 November 2009 - 3 December 2009
Llanidloes's immediate off-air parent was always Llandinam which was an off-air relay of Long Mountain. As part of the digital switchover plan, Long Mountain became a main transmitter in its own right. When the UK's digital switchover commenced at Llanidloes it therefore mirrored the changes taking place at Long Mountain. Analogue BBC Two Wales closed on channel 28 and ITV1 Wales took over on that frequency for what would be its final 3 weeks of service, vacating channel 25 as it did so. The new digital BBC A multiplex started up at full power in 64-QAM mode on channel 25.

Digital television

3 December 2009 - present
All the analogue television services closed and the new digital multiplexes took over their frequencies.

Analogue radio (FM VHF)

6 February 1967 - Circa 1990
From the outset, Llanidloes radiated the BBC's three FM radio services, acting as an off-air relay of Llandrindod Wells.

Present
Radio 2, Radio 3 and Radio Cymru still use the original frequencies that have been used since 1967, but Radio 1 launched in 1989 and at some point national Radio 4 was added which, along with Radio Cymru, have replaced the Welsh Home Service (later known as Radio Wales). The transmitters have also been upgraded to deliver 20 W each.

See also
List of masts
List of radio stations in the United Kingdom
List of tallest buildings and structures in Great Britain

References

External links
 MB21's page on BBC 405 TV to Wales and the West
 405 Alive's list of transmitters"
 More details on 405-line BBC transmitters
 The Transmission Gallery: Photographs and Information
 The 'ukfree' listing for Llanidloes

Buildings and structures in Powys
Transmitter sites in Wales
Wenvoe VHF 405-line Transmitter Group
Llanidloes